Arbace is an opera seria in three acts by Francesco Bianchi. The libretto was by Gaetano Sertor.

The opera was forward looking in its structure, with tension gradually mounting, via an exciting prison scene ("a fore-shadowing of romanticism") to a considerable climax. Marita P. McClymonds remarks on "The use of tonality, modality, chromaticism and strong dynamic contrasts for expressive purposes, as well as the liberal use of wind instruments ..."

Performance history
The opera was first performed at the Teatro di San Carlo in Naples on 20 January 1781. It was revived again in the same theatre on 4 November that same year.

Roles

Synopsis
Arbace's wife Semiri is in the hands of the lascivious Assyrian tyrant Scitalce. Arbace tries to rescue her by pretending to be his own assassin. Eventually they are rescued by Idaspe, Scitalce dies in a conflagration, and Arbace becomes the new ruler of Assyria.

References

 
 McClymonds, Marita P (1992), 'Arbace' in The New Grove Dictionary of Opera, ed. Stanley Sadie (London) 

Opera seria
Operas by Francesco Bianchi
1781 operas
Italian-language operas
Operas